Charles Demunter (born 12 January 1897, date of death unknown) was a Belgian footballer. He played in one match for the Belgium national football team in 1924.

References

External links
 

1897 births
Year of death missing
Belgian footballers
Belgium international footballers
Place of birth missing
Association football midfielders